The Regreg War (often erroneously called the Paregreg) was a civil war that took place in 1404–1406 within the Javanese empire of Majapahit. The conflict was fought as a war of independence between the Western court led by Wikramawardhana against the breakaway Eastern court led by Bhre Wirabhumi. This war of rivalry and secession had caused the calamity, crisis, court's preoccupation, the drain of financial resources, and exhaustion, that is thought to be one of the causes of Majapahit decline in the following years.

Terminology
This conflict is usually referred to as the Paregreg, but that term is based on a linguistic misunderstanding. In the Pararaton chronicle, in which the term for this war is found, events are labelled by adding the prefix pa- to one or more keywords. For example, the Javanese attack on Malayu in Sumatra in 1275 is called pamalayu, the rebellion of Rangga Lawe in 1295 is referred to as paranggalawe, and the massacre of the Sundanese at Bubat in 1357 is called pasuṇḍabubat. Hence the better translation of parĕgrĕg is "the Regreg incident". The word rĕgrĕg means slowly, with halts and jerks, but it can be a mutation of word ragrag (falling off one by one).

The division of West and East courts 
The Majapahit kingdom was established in 1293 by Raden Wijaya with the help of the cunning and able Arya Wiraraja, the Regent of Madura. As reward for Wiraraja's help, in 1295, Raden Wijaya agreed to give him the eastern portions of East Java, which includes Blambangan areas with Lumajang as its capital. Throughout Raden Wijaya's reign, Arya Wiraraja ruled the eastern realm peacefully as Majapahit's vassal, yet enjoyed substantial freedom. In 1316, Jayanagara, son and heir of Raden Wijaya, cracked down on the Nambi rebellion in Lumajang. Nambi was the successor of Arya Wiraraja. After that battle, the western and eastern realms of East Java were reunited.

According to Pararaton, in 1376 appeared "a new mountain", which hinted the emergence of a new keraton (court, palace, or center of power) opposed to the central authority of Majapahit. According to Ming Chinese chronicles, in 1377 there were two independent kingdoms in Java, both of which sent their envoys to the Ming court. The Western Kingdom was led by Wu-lao-po-wu, and the Eastern Kingdom was led by Wu-lao-wang-chieh.

Wu-lao-po-wu is Chinese pronunciation of Bhra Prabu, which refers to Hayam Wuruk (according to Pararaton), while Wu-lao-wang-chieh refers to Bhre Wengker, alias Wijayarajasa, the husband of Rajadewi (Hayam Wuruk's aunt). It seems that Wijayarajasa had ambition to be the Majapahit monarch. After the death of Gajah Mada, Tribhuwana Wijayatunggadewi, and Rajadewi, he built a new eastern court in Pamotan, thus in Pararaton, he was also mentioned as Bhatara Parameswara ring Pamotan.

Bhre Wirabhumi and Wikramawardhana rivalry 
The Regreg war was incited by Bhre Wirabhumi. The real name of Bhre Wirabhumi is unknown. His name simply means Bhre (Duke) of Wirabhumi, a province of Majapahit corresponds with Blambangan area in the "eastern hook" of Java. According to Pararaton, he is the son of Hayam Wuruk with a concubine, and adopted as a foster son by Bhre Daha (Rajadewi), the wife of Wijayarajasa. Later Bhre Wirabhumi would be married to Bhre Lasem sang Alemu, the daughter of Bhre Pajang (Hayam Wuruk's sister).

According to Nagarakretagama, the wife of Bhre Wirabhumi is Nagarawardhani, the daughter of Bhre Lasem or also known as Indudewi. Indudewi is the daughter of Rajadewi and Wijayarajasa. The Nagarakretagama is more valid than Pararaton, since it was written during Bhre Wirabhumi life time. During the reign of Hayam Wuruk and Wijayarajasa, the relations between the western court of Majapahit and the eastern court is described in somewhat an uneasy coexistence and mutual respect, since Wijayarajasa was Hayam Wuruk's father in-law.

After the death of Hayam Wuruk in 1389, he was succeeded by his nephew and also son in-law, Wikramawardhana. In the eastern court, after the death of Wijayarajasa in 1398, he was succeeded by his foster son that also his grand daughter's husband, Bhre Wirabhumi. Wirabhumi would rule the Blambangan kingdom with Lumajang as his capital. After the death of Indudewi, the position of Bhre Lasem was awarded to her daughter, Nagarawardhani. However Wikramawardhana also bestowed the title of Bhre lasem to his own wife, the queen Kusumawardhani. That is why in Pararaton there are two Bhre Lasem, Bhre Lasem Sang Halemu (The Fat Bhre Lasem) Bhre Wirabhumi's wife, and Bhre Lasem Sang Ahayu (The Beautiful Bhre Lasem) Wikramawardhana's wife. The contest of Bhre Lasem title has created an animosity between eastern and western courts, until 1400 when both Nagarawardhani and Kusumawardhani died. Wikramawardhana immediately appointed his daughter in-law as the new Bhre Lasem, the wife of Bhre Tumapel.

Regreg war 
After the appointment of the new Bhre Lasem, a dispute erupted between the two palaces. According to Pararaton, in 1402 Bhre Wirabhumi and Wikramawardhana were involved in a bitter quarrel, and afterwards they shunned each other and refused to talk. In 1403, through dangerous gamble of power, Wirabhumi sought military assistance from the Chinese court against Majapahit court. The Chinese Imperial court responded by recognizing his province's independence from Majapahit, in exchange Bhre Wirabhumi accepted a seal, commission, and other insignia of Chinese suzerainty over his land. This action would lead to a larger Regreg war in 1404. In Old Javanese, the word regreg means "to proceed with halts and jerks, to proceed slowly" (Zoetmulder 1982, s.v. "rĕgrĕg"). It indicates that there were many battles fought between eastern and western Majapahit throughout the two years, sometimes a battle was won by the western court, sometimes won by the eastern court.

Finally in 1406 the western troops led by Bhre Tumapel, son of Wikramawardhana, penetrated the eastern palace. Bhre Wirabhumi was defeated and fled using a boat during the night. He was chased down and killed by Raden Gajah, also known as Bhra Narapati, titled as Ratu Angabhaya of the western court. Raden Gajah brought the head of Bhre Wirabhumi to the western court (Trowulan). Later Bhre Wirabhumi would be sanctified in Girisa Pura temple located in Lung area.

The aftermath 
After the defeat of Bhre Wirabhumi, the eastern court was finally reunited with the western court. However, the ongoing conflicts all these years has kept Majapahit preoccupied and has loosened Majapahit grip on their overseas vassals. As one by one Majapahit overseas possessions outside of Java has liberated themselves and refuse to paid tribute to the central court, Majapahit could do nothing to assert their rules. In 1405, West Borneo was held under Chinese influence. Followed by the rebellions in Palembang, Malayu, and Malacca that would grow into thriving ports independent from Majapahit. In northern coast of Borneo, the Brunei Kingdom has also liberated themselves from Javanese overlordship.

Moreover, Wikramawardhana also owed a huge debt of gold to the Chinese Ming court, a blood money as the compensation for the death of Chinese envoys. During the Regreg war, some Chinese envoys were sent by Chinese Admiral Zheng He to visit the eastern court, however they were caught in the middle of the battle. Around 170 Chinese envoys were killed during this battle as collateral victims, which caused the uproar of the Chinese Ming Emperor. For this incident Wikramawardhana was fined 60,000 tahil of gold by Ming's court. Until 1408 Wikramawardaha could only paid 10,000 tahil. In the end, the emperor Yong Le pardoned the fine out of pity to the Javanese king. This event was recorded in the Yingya Shenglan by Ma Huan who was Zheng He's secretary.

After the Regreg war, Wikramawardhana brought Bhre Daha, the daughter of Bhre Wirabhumi as a concubine. From that marriage born Suhita that would ascend to the throne as queen regnant in 1427 to succeed Wikramawardhana. During the reign of Suhita, the killer of Bhre Wirabhumi, Raden Gajah, was punished by death sentence in 1433.

The Regreg war in Javanese literature 
The Regreg war is remembered in the collective memory of Javanese tradition. After the advent of Islamic polities in Java, the theme of Regreg war appeared in Javanese literatures, such as in Serat Kanda, Serat Damarwulan, and Serat Blambangan.

According to the tales in Serat Kanda, there was a war between Queen Kencanawungu, the ruler of Majapahit in the west against Menak Jingga the ruler of Blambangan in the east. Menak Jingga finally was killed by Damarwulan, a knight sent by Queen Kencanawungu. As the reward, Damarwulan would be wed to Queen Kencanawungu and become the king of Majapahit, stylized as Prabu Mertawijaya. From their union would born king Brawijaya the last king of Majapahit.

See also

Nagarakretagama
Pararaton
Battle of Bubat
Blambangan

References

Bibliography 

 
 
 

Majapahit
Conflicts in 1406
Military history of Indonesia
1406 in Asia
History of East Java
Conflicts in 1404
Conflicts in 1405
1404 in Asia
1405 in Asia
Civil wars involving the states and peoples of Asia
Wars of succession involving the states and peoples of Asia